GDJ may refer to:
 Gandajika Airport, Democratic Republic of the Congo
 Granbury Regional Airport, Texas, United States
 Gurdjar language